Sphingosine kinase 2 is a protein that in humans is encoded by the SPHK2 gene.

This gene encodes one of two sphingosine kinase isozymes that catalyze the phosphorylation of sphingosine into sphingosine 1-phosphate. Sphingosine 1-phosphate mediates many cellular processes including migration, proliferation and apoptosis, and also plays a role in several types of cancer by promoting angiogenesis and tumorigenesis. The encoded protein may play a role in breast cancer proliferation and chemoresistance. Alternatively spliced transcript variants encoding multiple isoforms have been observed for this gene. [provided by RefSeq, Aug 2011].

Inhibitors
 Opaganib

References

Further reading 
 
 
 
 
 
 
 
 
 
 
 

EC 2.7.1